Vivir intentando  is a 2003 Argentine family musical film starring the 5 members of girl group Bandana.

The film provides a fictional account of the band's formation, and was premiered on 14 June 2003 in Buenos Aires.

Plot

Cast
 Ivonne Guzmán as Ivonne
 Lourdes Cecilia Fernández as Lourdes
 Valeria Gastaldi as Valeria
 Virginia Da Cunha as Viri
 María Elizabeth Vera as Lissa

Critical reception
The film met with mixed reviews.

One critic claimed it a success "thanks to the competent technical aspects, precise use of emotion that plays with the audience, but above all, the atmosphere which it creates in the cinema."

Others were less complimentary, commenting "their acting talents are just passable.....the songs shine due to the absence thereof..... and the script comes straight from the 'teenager dreams of being a  singer' handbook"
In spite of this, the movie grossed over ARS 1,500,000.

References

External links
 .
 
 Official site.

2003 films
Argentine musical films
Argentine independent films
2000s Spanish-language films
2000s musical films
Buena Vista International films
2000s Argentine films